Ezequiel Matías Muñoz (born 8 October 1990) is an Argentine footballer who plays as a centre-back for Argentine club Estudiantes. His nickname is Il niño di Pergamino or El Chiquito.

Club career
At 18 years of age, Muñoz made his league debut with Boca Juniors during a 0–1 defeat to Estudiantes de La Plata during the 2009 Clausura tournament. He had, however, previously played with the team during the 2008 Copa Sudamericana. Subsequently, he suffered a cruciate ligament injury to his knee, which stalled his progression in the team. He returned to the field during the 2010 Clausura, during a 2–2 draw with Argentinos Juniors.

In August 2010, Serie A club Palermo announced the signing of Ezequiel Muñoz from Boca Juniors. He made his debut with the Sicilian club on 26 August 2010, when he was picked as a starter in the return leg of the 2010–11 UEFA Europa League play-off round against NK Maribor. He debuted in Serie A on 29 August 2010 against Cagliari.

On 2 February 2015, Sampdoria confirmed that they had taken Muñoz on loan. After only four matches, on 18 July 2015 he signed a 4-year contract as a free agent for Genoa.

On 8 August 2017, Muñoz switched teams and countries again, signing a three-year deal with La Liga side CD Leganés, for a rumoured fee of € 2 million. Ten days later he made his debut for the club, starting in a 1–0 home win against Deportivo Alavés.

On 12 June 2019, Munoz signed with Argentine side Lanús.

On 26 September, Munoz signed with Argentine side Independiente

International career
In 2009, Muñoz was called by the Argentina national team coach Diego Maradona for a friendly match against Panama in a squad exclusively formed with footballers based on the Argentine league. Nonetheless, he had to be left out after suffering the cruciate ligament injury to his knee.

Career statistics

References

External links
 
 Argentine Primera statistics at Fútbol XXI 
 
 
 
 

1990 births
Living people
Sportspeople from Buenos Aires Province
Argentine footballers
Argentine expatriate footballers
Argentina youth international footballers
Argentina under-20 international footballers
Association football central defenders
Argentine Primera División players
Boca Juniors footballers
Serie A players
Serie B players
Palermo F.C. players
U.C. Sampdoria players
Genoa C.F.C. players
La Liga players
CD Leganés players
Club Atlético Lanús footballers
Club Atlético Independiente footballers
Estudiantes de La Plata footballers
Argentine expatriate sportspeople in Italy
Argentine expatriate sportspeople in Spain
Expatriate footballers in Italy
Expatriate footballers in Spain